The 2009 FIM Speedway World Championship Grand Prix of Italy will be the tenth race of the 2009 Speedway Grand Prix season. It took place on 26 September in the Pista Olimpia Terenzano in Terenzano, Italy. It will be first Speedway Grand Prix (SGP) event held in Terenzano; previous Italian SGP events had always taken place in Lonigo.

The first Grand Prix in Terensano was won by Pole Tomasz Gollob who beat Hans N. Andersen, Nicki Pedersen and Grzegorz Walasek in the final.

Riders 

The Speedway Grand Prix Commission nominated Guglielmo Franchetti as the wild card and Mattia Carpanese and Andrea Maida as the track reserves. The riders' starting positions draw for Grand Prix meeting was made on 25 September at 13:00 CEST by Mayor of Terenzano.

Heat details

Heat after heat 
 Harris, Jonsson, Nicholls, Adams
 Gollob, Lindgren, Walasek, Carpanese (Franchetti – M/-) Franchetti fails to meet the 2 minute warning and is replaced by reserve rider Carpanese.
 Andersen, Crump, Hancock, Holta
 Sayfutdinov, Pedersen, Ułamek, Bjerre (R3)
 Holta, Harris, Ułamek, Lindgren
 Bjerre, Adams, Franchetti, Crump
 Gollob, Jonsson, Andersen, Pedersen
 Sayfutdinov, Walasek, Hancock, Nicholls
 Andersen, Harris, Sayfutdinov, Franchetti
 Hancock, Lindgren, Adams, Pedersen
 Walasek, Holta, Jonsson, Bjerre
 Gollob, Crump, Nicholls, Ułamek
 Gollob, Harris, Bjerre, Hancock
 Andersen, Walasek, Ułamek, Adams
 Jonsson, Lindgren, Sayfutdinov, Crump
 Pedersen, Holta, Nicholls, Franchetti
 Walasek, Pedersen, Harris, Crump
 Sayfutdinov, Gollob, Holta, Adams
 Jonsson, Hancock, Franchetti, Ułamek
 Nicholls, Andersen, Bjerre, Lindgren
 Semi-finals:
 Gollob, Walasek, Harris, Holta
 Pedersen, Andersen, Jonsson, Sayfutdinov
 The Final:
 Gollob (6 pts), Andersen (4 pts), Pedersen (2 pts), Walasek

The intermediate classification

See also 
 Speedway Grand Prix
 List of Speedway Grand Prix riders

References

External links 
 FIM-live.com 

I
2009